Janet S. Metcalf (née De Puydt; December 21, 1935) is an American politician in the state of Iowa.

Metcalf was born in Des Moines, Iowa. A Republican, she served in the Iowa House of Representatives from 1985 to 2003 (83d district from 1987 to 1993 and 75th district from 1993 to 2003).

References

1935 births
Living people
Women state legislators in Iowa
Republican Party members of the Iowa House of Representatives
21st-century American women